The 1 Second Film is an American non-profit collaborative art project. The 1 Second Film began as a student project by Nirvan Mullick in 2001. Receiving contributions from thousands of people around the world, including many celebrities. The project is currently dormant.

The film is built around one second of animation (made of 12 large collaborative paintings), and is followed by 1 hour of credits, listing everyone who signs up (regardless of whether a contribution is made or not). A feature-length "making of" documentary will play alongside the credits.

The project allows people around the world to participate online, and lists everyone who joins the crew as "Special Thanks" in the film credits. The production relies on crowd funding to raise the budget; everyone who donates or raises US$1 or more gets their name listed as a Producer in the film's credits. The production also gives a Publicist credit to crew members who refer at least one friend. The film currently has over 56,000 crew members from 158 countries.

The 1 Second Film is the flagship production of The Collaboration Foundation, a 501(c)(3) non-profit arts organization formed to create global collaborative art projects that address various social issues. Once finished, any profits raised by The 1 Second Film will be donated to the Global Fund for Women, an independent charity. The online community being formed by The 1 Second Film project will be able to participate in future Collaboration Foundation projects.

In 2016, the director, Nirvan Mullick, posted an update on the project, stating it had been dormant, being put on the "back burner" in 2012, but he planned to revive it shortly, this never happened. By January 2019 the project's website was offline entirely due to a database corruption.

Production

The title of The 1 Second Film derives from the fact that the animation at the core of the film project is just one second long (24 frames). The animation consists of 12 large frames (9 ft x 5 ft paintings). The frames were painted by hundreds of people during a multi-disciplinary event on March 8, 2001 (International Women's Day) at California Institute of the Arts. The event included live-performers and musicians; people attending the event were invited to help paint the frames of animation. Each frame had an art director that engaged the audience as participants; color design for the animation was selected by Jules Engel. Each of the 12 paintings is filmed twice (on 70 mm film) to create the 24 frames in one second of film.

The one second of animation will be immediately followed by an estimated one hour of end credits. Alongside the credits will be a feature-length documentary on the creation of the artwork.

The film is being crowd-funded by public donations. Donors receive a Producer credit in the film for a minimum of US$1.00 (with no maximum). Producers get listed in order of amount donated.

Project history
The 1 Second Film began as a student project by Nirvan Mullick in 2001 while at California Institute of the Arts. The director set out to create a collaborative art project that would bring his school together, and later expanded the project after the success of the initial event. Seed funds for the animation painting event came from a US$1,500 CalArts Grant, an additional US$3,000 was raised by selling producer credits for donations of US$1 or more. In 2004, after graduating and finishing two other animated short films, the director began fundraising to expand The 1 Second Film project by selling US$1 producer credits on the streets of Los Angeles. After raising enough to buy a video camera, the director began to document the fundraising process to include as part of a documentary about the project. In 2005, after getting several celebrities to donate, the director launched a petition drive along with the help of Stephen Colbert to get the credits of The 1 Second Film listed on the Internet Movie Database. In March 2005, IMDb began listing the credits.
The IMDb listing helped the project to grow online. In May 2006, a video of several high-profile celebrities donating to The 1 Second Film was featured on the homepage of YouTube, helping the project raise over US$7,000 in four days. In 2007, the project's first automated website was built to give community profiles to all participants, allowing for the project to scale up. The film's failure to materialize to date has led to speculation of fraud.

IMDb controversy
The director of The 1 Second Film submitted the celebrity producer credits of The 1 Second Film to the Internet Movie Database. After being rejected, the director sent a link to a video of Stephen Colbert requesting his US$11 producer credit be listed on IMDb. IMDb then began to list all of The 1 Second Film's credits, including unknowns who donated US$1 or more to the project online. Thousands of people began to discover the film title under the production credits of the various celebrities involved. The project spread online, attracting donations from around the world. Several celebrities also donated online, including Jonah Hill and Ryan Reynolds. The IMDb listing reached over 3,000 producers. However, due to the high volume of submissions, IMDb replaced all of the film's individual producer credits with a single credit for "Producers of The 1 Second Film." The entire project was later removed from IMDb. Jon Reeves, head of data acquisition at IMDb, released a statement calling the project a "performance art project (rather) than an actual film".

Celebrity producers
A variety of celebrities have donated to become producers of the project. Producers include:

Tom Arnold
Kevin Bacon
Michel Barrette
Tyson C. Beckford
Ed Begley Jr.
Zoë Bell
Justin Berfield
Selma Blair
Jesse Bradford
Pierce Brosnan
Steve Buscemi
Bobby Cannavale
Robert Carradine
Michael Cera
Stephen Colbert
Steve Coogan
Coolio
James Cromwell

Alan Cumming
Andy Dick
Richard Edson
Atom Egoyan
Rick Fox
Patrick Fugit
Michel Gondry
Seth Green
Tom Green
Elliott Gould
Ben Harper
John Hawkes
Chad Hurley
Spike Jonze
Tony Kanal
Charlie Kaufman
David LaChapelle
John Leguizamo
Sam Longoria

Don McKellar
Mark McKinney
B. J. Novak
Bob Odenkirk
Todd Oldham
Stacy Peralta
Drew Pinsky
Bill Pullman
Brett Ratner
Christina Ricci
Jason Ritter
Mark Ruffalo
Pauly Shore
Ron Sparks
Kiefer Sutherland
Nia Vardalos
Kanye West
McKenzie Westmore

Contributors also include former YouTube CEO Chad Hurley, YouTube stars including iJustine and Brookers, as well as Kyle MacDonald from One red paperclip.

References

External links
  - link dead
 official website via wayback machine
 page on Mullick's website

American documentary films
Unreleased American films
2000s unfinished films
2000s English-language films
2000s American films